Gallio is a genus of skipper butterflies in the family Hesperiidae.

Species
Recognised species in the genus Gallio include:
 Gallio carasta (Schaus, 1902)
 Gallio danius (Bell, 1941)
 Gallio gallio (Schaus, 1902)
 Gallio garima (Schaus, 1902)
 Gallio madius (E. Bell, 1941)
 Gallio massarus (E. Bell, 1940)
 Gallio seriatus (Mabille, 1891)

References

Natural History Museum Lepidoptera genus database

Hesperiinae
Monotypic butterfly genera
Hesperiidae genera